Josef Karrer (born 3 March 1939) is a West German former handball player who competed in the 1972 Summer Olympics.

He was born in Großwallstadt.

In 1972 he was part of the West German team which finished sixth in the Olympic tournament. He played two matches and scored four goals.

External links
profile

1939 births
Living people
German male handball players
Olympic handball players of West Germany
Handball players at the 1972 Summer Olympics